100 Days of Summer is an American reality television series that premiered January 7, 2014, on Bravo. It chronicles the personal, professional, and social lives of six friends who reside in Chicago.

Cast
 Jay Michael – partner in a real estate development business.
 Pascale Wellin – co-founder of a jewelry line. Wellin was named to Chicago Magazine's list of most beautiful Chicagoans in 2011.
 Phillips Demming – founder of a clothing line that has clothes for dogs and humans.
 Ray Austin – former Chicago Bears player who is now a businessman, model, and actor.
 Tara Clack – a veterinarian.
 Vincent Anzalone – co-owner of an event marketing company and a property finance firm. Anzalone was named to Chicago Magazine's 2011 list of most eligible singles.

Episodes

References

External links

2010s American reality television series
2014 American television series debuts
English-language television shows
Television shows set in Chicago
Bravo (American TV network) original programming
2014 American television series endings